Junior Etoundi (born 30 January 1999) is a French professional footballer. As of 2021, he plays for FA Illkirch Graffenstaden.

Career

Covilhã
On 31 January 2020 Covilhã confirmed, that they had signed Etoundi.

References

External links 
 
 

1999 births
Living people
Footballers from Yaoundé
French footballers
French expatriate footballers
Association football midfielders
FC Dynamo Brest players
C.F. União players
S.C. Covilhã players
Belarusian Premier League players
Campeonato de Portugal (league) players
French expatriate sportspeople in Portugal
Expatriate footballers in Belarus
Expatriate footballers in Portugal